

{{DISPLAYTITLE:Psi5 Aurigae}}

Psi5 Aurigae (ψ5 Aur, ψ5 Aurigae) is a star in the northern constellation of Auriga. It is faintly visible to the naked eye with an apparent visual magnitude of 5.25. Based upon parallax measurements made during the Hipparcos mission, this star is approximately  distant from Earth. There is an optical companion which is 36 arcseconds away and has an apparent magnitude of +8.4.

The spectrum of this star shows it to be a G-type main sequence star with a stellar classification of G0 V. Thought to be around 4 billion years old, it is similar in size, mass, and composition to the Sun, making this a solar analog. It is radiating energy into space at an effective temperature of 5,989 K, giving it the golden-hued glow of a G-type star.

Observation in the infrared shows an excess emission that suggests the presence of a circumstellar disk of dust, known as a debris disk. This material has a mean temperature of 60 K, indicating that it is orbiting at a distance of about 29 astronomical units from the host star. The dust has about half the mass of the Moon and is around 600 million years old. The star is being examined for evidence of extrasolar planets, but none have been found so far.

See also
 Psi Aurigae

References

External links
 HR 2483
 CCDM J06467+4335
 Image Psi5 Aurigae

Aurigae, Psi05
Aurigae, 56
048682
032480
Auriga (constellation)
Double stars
G-type main-sequence stars
Circumstellar disks
Aurigae, 56
2483
Durchmusterung objects
0245